Hurley is an American company that sells clothes and accessories marketed towards surfing and swimming. Established in 1979 as a distributor for Billabong clothing in the United States, Hurley was sold to Nike, Inc. in 2002 for an undisclosed price and then to Bluestar Alliance LLC in 2019 for an undisclosed price.

Products sold include clothing, swimsuits, wetsuits, flip-flops (sandals), bags and backpacks.

History
Hurley was founded in 1979 by 24-year-old Bob Hurley (along with partner Bob Rowland and Business Manager Joe Knoernschild) as "Hurley Surfboards//International Pro Designs" (I.P.D.). Hurley worked for five years as a surf board shaper for various companies; including Lightning Bolt; Wind-an-Sea and Wave Tools. While becoming known as one of the premiere shapers in Southern California, Hurley licensed the U.S. rights to the up-and-coming Australian surf brand Billabong, and formed Billabong USA in 1983. Founding partners in Billabong USA besides Hurley were Bob Rowland (General Partners), and as limited partners Chip Rowland, Mike Ochsner, Joe Knoernschild, Tom Fletcher and Bill Hurley. By the mid-1980s, Billabong USA was doing well. Bob and his team were committed to doing things differently and took full responsibility for design, sourcing, marketing and financing.

In 1998, the U.S. licensing rights for Billabong were up for renewal after the company had grown to over $70 million in sales in America. The USA management team decided to not renew the USA license for Billabong USA and in 1999 Hurley International was born. Founding working partners of Billabong USA Hurley, Knoernschild, Ochsner and Bill Hurley transitioned over to Hurley International. Billabong USA's designer Lian Murray also became a partner with the newly created Hurley International.
 
On February 22, 2002, the company was sold to Nike, Inc. for an undisclosed amount.

On June 4, 2012, Nike announced that Bob Hurley would assume the interim CEO role at Hurley International, LLC. replacing Michael Egeck who has decided to leave the company. Hurley stepped down as CEO in 2015 and was replaced by Bob Coombes. In June 2019, Nike Inc. appointed John Schweitzer as CEO and CFO of the Hurley brand.

On October 29, 2019, Nike announced the sale of Hurley to Bluestar Alliance LLC for an undisclosed amount. On December 28, 2019, surf publication Beach Grit reported that Hurley would not renew the contracts of professional surfers it sponsors.

On the 23rd January 2020, Conquest Sports, the licensee for the Converse brand in Australia and New Zealand announced a joint venture partnership with Blue Star Alliance LLC (USA) to distribute the Hurley brand in Australia and New Zealand. The Hurley brand trades under the company Hurley Australasia PTY Ltd since March 1st 2020 for Australia & New Zealand. Hurley then launched its first Australian focused site (https://www.hurley.com.au/) in July 2021.

A major part of the company's success has been the endorsement of pop-punk bands such as Blink-182 and All Time Low. Furthering their involvement in the music industry, Hurley sponsors the heavy metal band Avenged Sevenfold, the metalcore band Parkway Drive, and reggae band The Green.

References

External links
 

Surfwear brands
Clothing companies of the United States
Clothing companies established in 1979
2002 mergers and acquisitions
2019 mergers and acquisitions
Skateboarding companies
Snowboarding companies
Swimwear manufacturers
Companies based in Costa Mesa, California
1979 establishments in California
1990s fashion
2000s fashion
2010s fashion